The men's hammer throw field event at the 1972 Summer Olympics took place on September 4 & 7. There were 31 competitors from 17 nations. The maximum number of athletes per nation had been set at 3 since the 1930 Olympic Congress. The event was won by Anatoliy Bondarchuk of the Soviet Union, the nation's third victory in the men's hammer throw. Fellow Soviet Vasiliy Khmelevskiy took bronze. Silver went to Jochen Sachse of East Germany, the nation's first medal in the event. The Soviet Union's medal streak in the event extended to five Games, while Hungary's ended after three Games (three-time medalist Gyula Zsivótzky finished fifth this time).

Background

This was the 16th appearance of the event, which has been held at every Summer Olympics except 1896. Six of the 13 finalists from the 1968 Games returned: gold medalist (and 1960 and 1964 silver medalist) Gyula Zsivótzky of Hungary, fourth-place finisher (who lost the bronze on a tie-breaker) Takeo Sugawara of Japan, fifth-place finisher (and 1964 finalist) Sándor Eckschmiedt of Hungary, seventh-place finisher Reinhard Theimer of East Germany, tenth-place finisher Howard Payne of Great Britain, and thirteenth-place finisher Yoshihisa Ishida of Japan. Anatoliy Bondarchuk of the Soviet Union was the 1969 European Champion and the favorite in the event.

Bulgaria and Uruguay each made their debut in the event. The United States appeared for the 16th time, the only nation to have competed at each appearance of the event to that point.

Competition format

The competition used the two-round format introduced in 1936, with the qualifying round completely separate from the divided final. In qualifying, each athlete received three attempts; those recording a mark of at least 66.00 metres advanced to the final. If fewer than 12 athletes achieved that distance, the top 12 would advance. The results of the qualifying round were then ignored. Finalists received three throws each, with the top eight competitors receiving an additional three attempts. The best distance among those six throws counted.

Records

Prior to this competition, the existing world and Olympic records were as follows:

Anatoliy Bondarchuk's first throw of the final went 75.50 metres for a new Olympic record; nobody was able to better it. The other two medalists, Jochen Sachse and Vasiliy Khmelevskiy, beat the old record but not Bondarchuk's new one.

Schedule

All times are Central European Time (UTC+1)

Results

All throwers reaching  and the top 12 including ties advanced to the finals. All qualifiers are shown in blue. All distances are listed in metres.

Qualifying

Final

References

External links
Official report

Men's hammer throw
Hammer throw at the Olympics
Men's events at the 1972 Summer Olympics